was a samurai retainer to Japanese warlord Toyotomi Hideyoshi during the Azuchi-Momoyama period of the 17th century.
He was known as one of the "Seven Spears of Shizugatake". 

Following the Battle of Shizugatake in 1583, Nagayasu came to be known as one of the shichi-hon-yari (七本槍), or Seven Spears of Shizugatake. These Seven would be among Hideyoshi's most trusted generals. Owing to his achievement in that battle, he   was rewarded with 3,000 additional koku.

In 1600, He fought alongside the Tokugawa Ieyasu's "Eastern Army" at the Battle of Sekigahara. 

In 1614, He was changed sides once again, requesting to serve under the Toyotomi clan in the Siege of Osaka, but was denied.

Nagayasu became a hatamoto in the Edo period.

References

1559 births
1628 deaths
Hatamoto
Samurai
Toyotomi retainers